The Lowell Fire Department provides fire protection and emergency medical services to the city of Lowell, Massachusetts.

Stations and apparatus
Below is a full listing of all fire station and apparatus locations in the city of Lowell. Fire Headquarters is located at 99 Moody St., the JFK Civic Center.

References

Fire departments in Massachusetts
Government of Middlesex County, Massachusetts
Fire
Organizations with year of establishment missing